is a game in the Shenmue series released for smartphones in Japan. The game was conceived as a way of relaunching the game franchise by series creator Yu Suzuki. It was announced in late 2010 for cell phones and also for PCs, but only a cell phone version was released. The game was discontinued in late 2011.

Gameplay
Players control one of the residents of Yokosuka, which was the setting for Shenmue. There were also plans to let players travel to other Shenmue locations such as Hong Kong in content updates.

Plot
The main character is a follower of Ryo Hazuki and is guided by him to explore, attempt quests, and grow strong through battle. Characters from other Shenmue games make appearances, and much of the original Shenmue plot is retold.

Development
Shenmue City was conceived when Yu Suzuki noted the popularity of Mafia Wars, a social game designed for mobile phones. Suzuki formed a plan that if the game was a success, its popularity could be used to make a game to conclude the Shenmue series. Suzuki stated in an interview with Famitsu that he wanted to explore the series without very expensive graphics or sound elements like the original game. The games beta began on September 21, 2010 on the Yahoo! Japan and Japanese phone carrier DeNA's Yahoo! Mobage network. On October 7, 2010, Shenmue City was also announced for the PC as a browser-based game with a winter 2010 release date, but was never released. The game shut down on December 26, 2011.

References

External links
Official Shenmue series website
Official YS Net website
Official Shenmue City website
 Facebook page

2010 video games
Free-to-play video games
Mobile games
Shenmue
Video games designed by Yu Suzuki
Japan-exclusive video games
Video games developed in Japan